Hale Area Schools is a public school district in the U.S. state of Michigan serving kindergarten through twelfth grade, and draws its approximately 831 students from the townships of Plainfield, Reno, and Grant in Iosco County as well as Hill and Logan townships in Ogemaw County.

The district includes Hale Elementary School (K-4), Hale Middle School (5-8), and Hale High School (9-12).

External links
Hale Area Schools
Iosco Regional Educational Service Agency

School districts in Michigan
Education in Iosco County, Michigan
Education in Ogemaw County, Michigan